The 1939 Madrid Victory Parade was held in Madrid on May 19, 1939, over a month after the victory of the Nationalists in the Spanish Civil War (1936–1939). It was the first of a yearly series held from then on in April the First, named Día de la Victoria (Victory Day). 

The parade was commanded by General Andrés Saliquet, Commander of the Madrid Military Region, and was presided by the Head of State Generalísimo Franco.

More than 120.000 men and 1.000 vehicles took part in the parade, including small contingents of the German Condor Legion, the Italian Corpo Truppe Volontarie and the Portuguese Viriatos. The forces went along Paseo de la Castellana, the main Madrid avenue, in a North to South direction and in total spent around 4 hours in marching past the full path. Around 400.000 people attended the event.

The environment was spectacularly fitted out with countless patriotic, triumphal and Franco`s Cult of personality slogans.

See also
 Hispano-Suiza J12

Sources
 
 
 
 
 

Spanish Civil War
1939 in Spain